The 1890 Brooklyn Bridegrooms left the American Association and joined the National League. They won the league championship, becoming one of a select few teams to win championships in different leagues in back-to-back seasons.

Regular season

Season standings

Record vs. opponents

Roster

Player stats

Batting

Starters by position 
Note: Pos = Position; G = Games played; AB = At bats; R = Runs scored; H = Hits; Avg. = Batting average; HR = Home runs; RBI = Runs batted in; SB = Stolen bases

Other batters 
Note: G = Games played; AB = At bats; R = Runs scored; H = Hits; Avg. = Batting average; HR = Home runs; RBI = Runs batted in; SB = Stolen bases

Pitching

Starting pitchers 
Note: G = Games pitched; GS = Games started; CG = Complete games; IP = Innings pitched; W = Wins; L = Losses; ERA = Earned run average; BB = Bases on balls; SO = Strikeouts

Other pitchers 
Note: G = Games pitched; GS = Games started; CG = Complete games; IP = Innings pitched; W = Wins; L = Losses; ERA = Earned run average; BB = Bases on balls; SO = Strikeouts

1890 World Series 

In the 1890 World Series, the Bridegrooms faced the American Association Champions, the Louisville Colonels. The Series ended in a 3–3–1 tie.

References 
Baseball-Reference season page
Baseball Almanac season page

External links 
Brooklyn Dodgers reference site
Acme Dodgers page 
Retrosheet

Los Angeles Dodgers seasons
National League champion seasons
Brooklyn Bridegrooms season
Brooklyn
19th century in Brooklyn
Park Slope